Sharon Springs is a city in and the county seat of Wallace County, Kansas, United States.  As of the 2020 census, the population of the city was 751.

History
Sharon Springs was originally called Eagle Tail station when it was founded in 1868. It was renamed Sharon Springs in 1886, after Sharon Springs, New York. Sharon Springs was incorporated as a city in 1890.

In 2013, the largest sinkhole in Kansas opened north of Sharon Springs.

On April 22, 2022, a high-end EF1 tornado caused severe damage to the city.

Geography
Sharon Springs is located at  (38.895513, -101.750881).

Climate
According to the Köppen Climate Classification system, Sharon Springs has a semi-arid climate, abbreviated "BSk" on climate maps.

Demographics

2010 census
As of the census of 2010, there were 748 people, 327 households, and 197 families residing in the city. The racial makeup of the city was 94.5% White, 0.1% African American, 0.4% Native American, 3.6% from other races, and 1.3% from two or more races. Hispanic or Latino of any race were 5.7% of the population.

There were 327 households, of which 27.2% had children under the age of 18 living with them, 51.7% were married couples living together, 6.1% had a female householder with no husband present, 2.4% had a male householder with no wife present, and 39.8% were non-families. 38.2% of all households were made up of individuals, and 22.3% had someone living alone who was 65 years of age or older. The average household size was 2.23 and the average family size was 2.99.

The median age in the city was 45.3 years. 25.5% of residents were under the age of 18; 4.9% were between the ages of 18 and 24; 19.2% were from 25 to 44; 25.4% were from 45 to 64; and 25% were 65 years of age or older. The gender makeup of the city was 48.8% male and 51.2% female.

2000 census
As of the census of 2000, there were 835 people, 354 households, and 227 families residing in the city. The racial makeup of the city was 96.05% White, 0.24% African American, 0.48% Native American, 1.68% from other races, and 1.56% from two or more races. Hispanic or Latino of any race were 4.31% of the population.

There were 354 households, out of which 29.7% had children under the age of 18 living with them, 57.3% were married couples living together, 3.7% had a female householder with no husband present, and 35.6% were non-families. 33.9% of all households were made up of individuals, and 17.8% had someone living alone who was 65 years of age or older. The average household size was 2.29 and the average family size was 2.93.

In the city, the population was spread out, with 24.2% under the age of 18, 7.9% from 18 to 24, 22.5% from 25 to 44, 21.3% from 45 to 64, and 24.1% who were 65 years of age or older. The median age was 42 years. For every 100 females, there were 90.2 males. For every 100 females age 18 and over, there were 95.4 males.

The median income for a household in the city was $33,333, and the median income for a family was $43,684. Males had a median income of $27,500 versus $14,600 for females. The per capita income for the city was $17,656. About 4.3% of families and 7.3% of the population were below the poverty line, including 6.7% of those under age 18 and 10.8% of those age 65 or over.

Transportation
Sharon Springs is located on U.S. Route 40.

References

Further reading

External links

 City of Sharon Springs
 Sharon Springs - Directory of Public Officials
 Wallace County, Wallace County economic development alliance
 USD 241, local school district
 Historic Photograph of City
 Sharon Springs City Map, KDOT

Cities in Wallace County, Kansas
Cities in Kansas
County seats in Kansas
1868 establishments in Kansas
Populated places established in 1868